David Libai (born 22 October 1934) is an Israeli jurist and former politician. He was a member of the Knesset for Labour from 1984 to 1996, and served as Minister of Justice from 1992 to 1996.

Biography
David Libai was born in Tel Aviv. He attended Ironi Alef High School and studied law at the Hebrew University in the academic reserve program of the Israel Defense Forces. He received his MA from the Institute of Criminology and Criminal Law in Tel Aviv University (where he served as Dean of Students) and his PhD from University of Chicago Law School. He served as deputy chief military prosecutor and was discharged as a major.

Libai is married and is the father of Daniel and Daphne.

Political and public career
Libai began his professional career in the office of Minister of Justice Pinchas Rosen, in charge of the amnesty department and as spokesman for the Ministry. In 1960 he was certified as a lawyer. He was appointed chief assistant to attorney-general Colin Gillon and chief prosecutor of the state workers' disciplinary court.

In 1964 he opened a private law office. In 1977 he became chairman of the Labor Party's constitution committee. From 1983 to 1985 he was head of the Israeli Bar. He has also been a member of the National inquiry commission on prison conditions, member of the Press Council, and chairman of the Israel-Britain Parliamentary Friendship Association. He is an associate professor at Tel Aviv University and the Herzliya Interdisciplinary Center.

In 1984 he was elected to the eleventh Knesset for the Alignment. In the eleventh and twelfth Knessets he was chairman of the State Control Committee and a member of the House, Constitution and Law and Justice Committee (of which he was also a member in the fourteenth Knesset). During his tenure, the State Control Committee appointed the Bejski Commission to investigate the bank stock crisis of 1983.

After he was elected to the thirteenth Knesset for the Labor Party, he was appointed Minister of Justice by Prime Minister Yitzhak Rabin. He also held this position under Shimon Peres, following Rabin's assassination. For a brief period in 1995 he was also Interior Minister. As Minister of Justice, he initiated three national inquiry commissions: concerning the 1994 Cave of the Patriarchs massacre, the Yemenite Children Affair, and Rabin's assassination. He resigned from the Knesset in 1996.

Private law practice
In 1997, he was hired him to defend Samuel Sheinbein, an Israeli-American who fled the United States and sought Israeli citizenship after committing murder. He successfully convinced the Israeli Supreme Court that Sheinbein was entitled to the protections of Israeli citizenship and could thus not be extradited to the United States. After the Supreme Court's decision in February 1999, Libai stated, "Our Supreme Court once again proved that it is independent and did not yield to political pressure from the United States", before adding that Israel's extradition laws were flawed and should be amended.

In 2006 he represented former Comverse Technology CEO Kobi Alexander. He also represented former Israeli President Moshe Katsav against rape charges, but later resigned as his attorney, claiming he had taken the case only when he believed it was a blackmail attempt.

Awards and recognition
He is the recipient of the Pinchas Rosen Award for his legal studies. In 2005 he received an ethics awards from Minister of Justice Tzipi Livni.

Published works

References

External links
 

1934 births
Living people
Alignment (Israel) politicians
Israeli jurists
Israeli Labor Party politicians
Israeli lawyers
Members of the 11th Knesset (1984–1988)
Members of the 12th Knesset (1988–1992)
Members of the 13th Knesset (1992–1996)
Members of the 14th Knesset (1996–1999)
Ministers of Internal Affairs of Israel
Ministers of Justice of Israel